John William Scott Macfie DSc (Edin.) (16 September 1879 – 11 October 1948) was an English entomologist, parasitologist and protozoologist,

Life 
Macfie was born in Eastham, Cheshire, England. He died in Hastings, Sussex, England.

Macfie was educated at Oundle School and Caius College, Cambridge. He was director of the Medical Research Institute in Accra between 1914 and 1923, having undertaken the same responsibilities in an acting capacity at Lagos in 1913.

He was awarded the Mary Kingsley medal by the Liverpool School of Tropical Medicine in 1919 and lectured at that institution on protozoology between 1923 and 1925.

Sources and further reading

British science writers
1879 births
1948 deaths
Scottish entomologists
Alumni of Gonville and Caius College, Cambridge
Alumni of the University of Edinburgh
People from Eastham, Merseyside